The Battle of Celaya took place on 8 and 9 March 1858 in Celaya (in the state of Guanajuato, Mexico), an early battle of the Reform War. Fought between elements of the liberal army, under General Anastasio Parrodi, governor of Jalisco, and elements of the conservative army, commanded by General Luis G. Osollo, the victory corresponded to the conservative side, and was the first liberal defeat. In the face of this defeat, the liberal General Parrodi fell back to Salamanca, where the next battle was fought.

The liberal defeat was caused by two main aspects. First, liberal General Moret did not hold the force of cavalry that he commanded: The general and other leaders of the liberal coalition forces had little communication. A fire in a carriage park of liberal soldiers also contributed to the defeat of the combined forces.

References

History of Guanajuato
1858 in Mexico
Conflicts in 1858
March 1858 events
Reform War